David and Lucy Tarr Fleming Mansion, also known as the Oxtoby Mansion, is a historic home located at Wellsburg, Brooke County, West Virginia. It was built in 1845, and is a -story, five bay, rectangular brick dwelling with a hipped roof in the Greek Revival style.  It sits on a stone ashlar foundation and features a full-length portico with a hipped roof supported by six Ionic order columns.  Also on the property are a contributing garage and carriage house.

It was listed on the National Register of Historic Places in 1986.

References

Houses on the National Register of Historic Places in West Virginia
Greek Revival houses in West Virginia
Houses completed in 1845
Houses in Brooke County, West Virginia
National Register of Historic Places in Brooke County, West Virginia